Premios MTV Latinoamérica (previously known as MTV Video Music Awards Latinoamérica or VMALA's) was the Latin American version of the Video Music Awards. They were established in 2002 to celebrate the top music videos of the year in Latin America and the world. They are presented annually and broadcast live on MTV Networks Latin America. Until 2004, all the VMALAs were held in Miami. The 2005 edition was the first one planned to be held outside the United States, but the show was cancelled (see below). The 2006 VMALAs (Premios MTV Latinoamérica) were held in Mexico City, and therefore were the first ones to actually be celebrated in Latin America. In 2010 the awards were permanently cancelled.

The statues given to winners of the award are called "Lenguas" because the statue is of a tongue. This is because, according to MTV, "the tongue (Spanish language) is what brings all Latin America together as a whole".

History
Created in 2002, the VMALAs were held in the Jackie Gleason Theatre in Miami Beach, Florida until 2004. Sylvia Villagran was the live announcer. In 2005 the awards were to be held Wednesday, October 19 at the Xcaret Park's Great Tlachco Theater in Playa del Carmen (close to Cancún), Quintana Roo, Mexico, for the first time in a different location since their creation. However, due to the approach of Hurricane Wilma towards the Mexican Riviera Maya, the show was moved from October 20 to the 19th, but it was eventually postponed. The date was then moved again, this time to December 22.
A couple of months later, MTV decided that it was not feasible to have the show on the aforementioned scheduled date. Instead, the awards were given out on a 1/2 hour special where the winners received their awards after having practical jokes played on them (in a  Punk'd style). Would-be hosts Molotov hosted this special and played live on a public concert in Playa del Carmen. Another special aired that same day with some of the winners performing. Miranda! played from their studio in Argentina. Two songs from Juanes's concert in Buenos Aires were also filmed by MTV for this special, and Panda and Reik also performed from MTV's studios in Mexico City. Another half-hour special was broadcast that day showing how the show was supposed to happen and the reaction of the artists and MTV's workers after they found out about its cancellation. The 2005 edition would have included performances by Shakira, Sean Paul, My Chemical Romance, Foo Fighters, Ricky Martin, Simple Plan, Miranda!, Babasónicos, Belinda, and Good Charlotte.

On July 21 MTV Latin America announced that the 2006 ceremonies would be held on 19 October 2006 in Palacio de los Deportes indoor arena in Mexico City. Also, MTV announced that the name of the awards would be changed from Video Music Awards Latin America to Premios MTV Latinoamérica (MTV Awards Latin America). The nominees for this year's awards were announced on September 4, introducing 3 new categories: Promising Artist, Breakthrough Artist, and Song of the Year (the only category with nominees in both English and Spanish). Also, Best Solo Artist again replaced Best Male and Female, while the award for Best International Hip-Hop/R&B Artist will not be handed out. It also appeared that the ceremony returned in style after the previous year's ceremony was cancelled in 2005 due to Hurricane Wilma and all of the presenters for the 2006 ceremony apologized to viewers during the broadcast for such, and, for the first time, viewers would be able to vote for the Best Independent Artist award, but a few days later, the category was taken completely off the voting list, which meant that its inclusion on it was an error by MTV. Also, MTV Tr3s will be handing out for the first time ever its own Viewer's Choice Award during their U.S. simulcast of the event. The following years the event was held in Mexico too (Mexico City in 2007 and Guadalajara, Jalisco in 2008).

In 2009 the event was held in three cities in different dates (September 30 in Buenos Aires, Argentina; October 5 in Mexico City, Mexico; October 11 in Bogotá, Colombia) and broadcast live in Los Angeles on October 15. In 2010 the awards were permanently cancelled and replaced by the MTV World Stage Mexico.

Premios MTV Host Cities

Award Categories 
 Artist of the Year (2002–2009)
 Video of the Year (2002–2009)
 Song of the Year (2006–2009)
 Best Solo Artist (2003–2004, 2006–2009)
 Best Group or Duet (2002–2009)
 Best Pop Artist (2002–2009)
 Best Rock Artist (2002–2009)
 Best Alternative Artist (2002–2009)
 Best Urban Artist (2007, 2009)
 Best Pop Artist — International
 Best Rock Artist — International
 Best New Artist — International
 Best Artist — North
 Best New Artist — North
 Best Artist — Central
 Best New Artist — Central
 Best Artist — South
 Best New Artist — South
 Breakthrough Artist
 "La Zona" Award
 Fashionista — Female
 Fashionista — Male
 Best Fan Club
 Best Video Game Soundtrack
 Best Ringtone
 Best Movie
 Best MTV Tr3́s Artist
 Agent of Change
 MTV Legend

Defunct Categories
 Best Hip-Hop/R&B Artist — International (2004–2005)
 Best Independent Artist
 Promising Artist
 Best Reunion Tour

Winners and nominees

MTV VMA International Viewer's Choice Award for MTV Internacional

1989
 Chayanne — "Este Ritmo Se Baila Así"
 Emmanuel — "La Última Luna"
 Fito Páez — "Sólo los Chicos"
 Gipsy Kings — "Djobi Djoba"
 Miguel Mateos–ZAS — "Y, sin Pensar"

1990
 Franco De Vita — "Louis"
 Gloria Estefan — "Oye Mi Canto"
 Los Prisioneros — "Tren al Sur"
 Soda Stereo — "En la Ciudad de la Furia"

1991
 Emmanuel — "Bella Señora"
 Franco De Vita — "No Basta"
 Juan Luis Guerra y 440 — "A Pedir Su Mano"
 Los Prisioneros — "Estrechez de Corazón"

1992
 Caifanes — "Nubes"
 El General — "Muévelo"
 El Último de la Fila — "Cuando el Mar Te Tenga"
 Gipsy Kings — "Baila Me"
 Mecano — "El 7 de Septiembre"

1993
 Café Tacuba — "María"
 Juan Luis Guerra y 440 — "El Costo de la Vida"
 Luis Miguel — "América, América"
 Mecano — "Una Rosa Es una Rosa"

MTV VMA International Viewer's Choice Award for MTV Latin America

1994
 Caifanes — "Afuera"
 Los Fabulosos Cadillacs — "El Matador"
 La Ley — "Tejedores de Ilusión"
 Mano Negra — "El Señor Matanza"

1995
 Café Tacuba — "La Ingrata"
 Fito Páez — "Circo Beat"
 Santana — "Luz Amor y Vida"
 Todos Tus Muertos — "Mate"
 Los Tres — "Déjate Caer"

1996
 Los Fabulosos Cadillacs — "Mal Bicho"
 Illya Kuryaki and the Valderramas — "Abarajame"
 Maldita Vecindad y los Hijos del 5to. Patio — "Don Palabras"
 Eros Ramazzotti — "La Cosa Más Bella"
 Soda Stereo — "Ella Usó Mi Cabeza Como un Revólver"

1997
 Azul Violeta — "Volveré a Empezar"
 Café Tacuba — "Chilanga Banda"
 Control Machete — "¿Comprendes Mendes?
 Fito Páez — "Cadáver Exquisito"
 Aleks Syntek y la Gente Normal — "Sin Ti"

1998

North
 Aterciopelados — "Cosita Seria"
 Illya Kuryaki and the Valderramas — "Jugo"
 La Ley — "Fotofobia"
 Molotov — "Gimme Tha Power"
 Plastilina Mosh — "Mr. P. Mosh"

South
 Andrés Calamaro — "Loco"
 Los Fabulosos Cadillacs — "Calaveras y Diablitos"
 Illya Kuryaki and the Valderramas — "Jugo"
 Molotov — "Gimme Tha Power" Turf — "Casanova"

1999
North
 Bersuit Vergarabat — "Sr. Cobranza"
 Café Tacuba — "Revés"
 Control Machete — "Sí, Señor"
 Ricky Martin — "Livin' la Vida Loca" Molotov — "El Carnal de las Estrellas"

South
 Los Auténticos Decadentes — "Los Piratas"
 Ricky Martin — "Livin' la Vida Loca" Miguel Mateos — "Bar Imperio"
 Molotov — "El Carnal de las Estrellas"
 Los Pericos — "Sin Cadenas"

2000
North
 Jumbo — "Siento Que"
 La Ley — "Aquí"
 Mœnia — "Manto Estelar"
 Shakira — "Ojos Así" Aleks Syntek — "Tú Necesitas"

South
 Gustavo Cerati — "Paseo Inmoral"
 Los Fabulosos Cadillacs — "La Vida" Illya Kuryaki and the Valderramas — "Coolo"
 Shakira — "Ojos Así"
 Diego Torres — "Donde Van"

2001
North
 Control Machete — "Amores Perros (featuring Ely Guerra)"
 Genitallica — "Imagina"
 La Ley — "Fuera de Mí"
 Paulina Rubio — "Y Yo Sigo Aquí"
 Alejandro Sanz — "El Alma al Aire"Southwest
 Chancho en Piedra — "Eligiendo una Reina"
 Dracma — "Hijo de Puta" La Ley — "Fuera de Mí"
 Paulina Rubio — "Y Yo Sigo Aquí"
 Stereo 3 — "Atrévete a Aceptarlo"

Southeast
 Catupecu Machu — "Y Lo Que Quiero Es Que Pises sin el Suelo" Natalia Oreiro — "Tu Veneno"
 Fito Páez — "El Diablo de Tu Corazón"
 Paulina Rubio — "Y Yo Sigo Aquí"
 Alejandro Sanz — "El Alma al Aire"

2002
North
 Enrique Iglesias — "Héroe"
 Juanes — "A Dios le Pido"
 Jumbo — "Cada Vez Que Me Voy"
 Celso Piña — "Cumbia sobre el Rio (featuring Control Machete and Blanquito Man)"
 Paulina Rubio — "Si Tú Te Vas"
 Shakira — "Suerte"Southwest
 Enrique Iglesias — "Héroe"
 Javiera y Los Imposibles — "Maldita Primavera"
 Juanes — "A Dios le Pido" Nicole — "Viaje Infinito"
 Stereo 3 — "Amanecer sin Ti"
 Shakira — "Suerte"

Southeast
 Babasónicos — "El Loco"
 Érica García — "Positiva"
 Enrique Iglesias — "Escapar"
 Juanes — "A Dios le Pido"
 Shakira — "Suerte"
 Diego Torres — "Color Esperanza"Records
Most wins

MTV Latin America's Regions
Like the MTV Europe Music Awards and the MTV Asia Awards, the VMALAs also hand out its regional categories. These regions, however, have been under constant changes and renaming. Here's how each region was perceived year by year:2002:
 North: Mexico, Central America, Dominican Republic, Venezuela, and Colombia
 Southwest: Chile, Peru, Bolivia, and Ecuador
 Southeast: Argentina, Paraguay, and Uruguay2003 — 2009''':
 North (Mexico in 2004): Mexico
 Central: Colombia, Chile, Peru, Ecuador, Central America, Dominican Republic, Venezuela and Bolivia
 South (Argentina in 2004): Argentina, Paraguay, Uruguay

External links
 MTVLA.com Site
 Music videos and commentary on the MTVLA 2009 Nominees

Latin American music
MTV Video Music Awards
Latin American music awards
Awards established in 2002
Awards disestablished in 2009
2002 establishments in Florida